Semionovca is a village in Ștefan Vodă District, Moldova.

References

Villages of Ștefan Vodă District